is a hydroelectric dam on the Itoshiro River, in the city of Ōno, Fukui prefecture, Japan. It is upriver of the confluence of the Itoshiro River and the larger Kuzuryū River.

The Yanbara Dam is located between the Washi Dam and the Yugami Hydroelectric Power Station, for which it provided a pumped storage facility.  The dam is a gravity dam, with a height of 23 meters and length of 114.6 meters. Construction began in 1965 and was completed by 1968.

References

Dams in Fukui Prefecture
Dams completed in 1968
Ōno, Fukui
Gravity dams
Hydroelectric power stations in Japan
Energy infrastructure completed in 1968